Bonnie Doon or Bonny Doon may refer to:

Places
Bonnie Doon, Victoria, Australia
Bonnie Doon railway station
Bonnie Doon, Queensland, Australia
Bonnie Doon, Edmonton, Canada
Bonnie Doon stop, a tram stop
Bonnie Doone, Ontario, Canada
Bonny Doon, California, U.S.

Other uses
 Arctostaphylos silvicola, or Bonny Doon manzanita
 Bonnie Doon Ice Cream, an American ice cream brand

See also

 "The Banks O' Doon", a 1791 song by Robert Burns
 River Doon, in Ayrshire, Scotland